The 1992 Iowa State Cyclones football team represented Iowa State University during the 1992 NCAA Division I-A football season.  They played their home games at Cyclone Stadium in Ames, Iowa. They participated as members of the Big Eight Conference.  The team was coached by head coach Jim Walden.

Schedule

Personnel

Season summary

Ohio

at Iowa

Tulane

Northern Iowa

at Oklahoma

Kansas

at Oklahoma State

Missouri

at Kansas State

Nebraska

at Colorado

Awards
Mark DouBrava
1st Team All-Big 12

James McMillion
1st Team All-Big 12

References

Iowa State
Iowa State Cyclones football seasons
Iowa State Cyclones football